The Chancellor of Brabant was the head of the civilian government of the late medieval and early-modern Duchy of Brabant as president of the Council of Brabant.

List of chancellors

Late Middle Ages

16th century

17th century

18th century

References

Duchy of Brabant